Robert James "Rick" Monday Jr. (born November 20, 1945) is an American former professional baseball player who now serves as a broadcaster.

A two-time All-Star, Monday played 19 seasons for the Kansas City/Oakland Athletics (1966–71), Chicago Cubs (1972–76) and Los Angeles Dodgers (1977–84). He is notable for being the first player selected in the inaugural 1965 Major League Baseball draft as well as for a 1976 incident in which he prevented a flag from being burned on the field at Dodger Stadium. After his playing career, he went on to serve as a Dodgers broadcaster on television and radio.

Amateur career

High school
Born in Batesville, Arkansas, Monday starred in baseball at Santa Monica High School in Southern California and earned league honors. After graduating from high school, Monday considered whether to accept a scholarship to play college baseball or to play professional baseball. He was offered a $20,000 signing bonus by Tommy Lasorda who was a scout for the Los Angeles Dodgers at the time however, he was convinced to accept a scholarship to play for Arizona State University after Sun Devils coach Bobby Winkles, an Arkansas native himself, drew upon their shared roots and promised Monday's Arkansas-born mother that he would take care of her son.

College
Monday joined the Arizona State Sun Devils team that included future major league players Sal Bando and Duffy Dyer. Reggie Jackson was allowed to practice with the team, but could not join the squad because the NCAA had a rule forbidding the use of freshman players. During his sophomore year Monday became the team leader, posting a .359 batting average along with 34 extra-base hits to earn All-American honors. He led the Sun Devils to the 1965 College World Series championship (over Ohio State) and earned College Player of the Year honors.

Monday was the first overall selection in the inaugural Major League First-Year Player Draft in 1965 by the Kansas City Athletics.

Minor leagues
The top pick of the first MLB draft as a 19-year-old, Monday signed with the A's for a $104,000 bonus on June 15. He began his professional career in the Single-A Northwest League with the Lewiston Broncs in Lewiston, Idaho. He singled in his professional debut on June 29 at Bethel Park in Eugene, Oregon, and played his first home game two nights later at Bengal Field in Lewiston. After the season, he and Bronc teammate Dave Duncan entered boot camp with the U.S. Marine Corps in San Diego in September, serving actively in the Reserve for six months before the beginning of spring training.

Monday played the 1966 season with the Mobile As of the Double-A Southern League in Mobile, Alabama. Mobile won the league title and five of its players were called up to the major league club in early September, including Monday, Sal Bando, and Rene Lachemann.

Major leagues
Following his major league debut in September 1966, Monday began the next season in the majors, the A's last year in Kansas City.  The team moved west to Oakland prior to the 1968 season, his first as an All-Star. Monday was with the A's through 1971, their first as American League West champions. He was traded for pitcher Ken Holtzman that November, and spent five productive seasons with the Chicago Cubs. In January 1977, Monday was traded in a five-player deal to the Los Angeles Dodgers for Bill Buckner and Iván DeJesús. The Dodgers won the National League pennant in 1977 and 1978.

Monday's best season in the major leagues came in 1976, his last with the Cubs. Batting in the leadoff position, he hit .272, establishing career highs in home runs (32), runs (107), RBI (77), total bases (271), slugging percentage (.507), and OPS (.853). He also finished 18th in the Most Valuable Player voting.

On May 16, 1972, Monday hit 3 home runs as a member of the Cubs against the Phillies in an 8–1 victory at Veterans Stadium.

Perhaps the most outstanding accomplishment in his playing career was his domination over pitcher Tom Seaver, arguably the best of his generation. Monday hit 11 home runs against Seaver, more than any other player, and batted .349 (30 hits in 86 at bats).

American flag incident

At Dodger Stadium in Los Angeles on April 25, 1976, two protesters ran into left-center field and tried to set fire to an American flag after the start of the bottom of the 4th inning. Monday, the Cubs center fielder, had been tossing a practice ball with left fielder José Cardenal before the incident happened. After Ken Crosby of the Cubs threw a pitch that made Ted Sizemore pop out, Monday dashed over and grabbed the flag to thunderous cheers. Monday ran through the outfield  with the flag and while walking towards the Dodgers dugout, met and handed the flag over to Dodgers pitcher Doug Rau. When Monday came to bat in the top half of the 5th inning, he got a standing ovation from the crowd and the scoreboard behind the left-field bleachers in the stadium flashed the message, "" He later said, "If you're going to burn the flag, don't do it around me. I've been to too many veterans' hospitals and seen too many broken bodies of guys who tried to protect it." Monday had served, while playing Major League Baseball, a six-year commitment with the United States Marine Corps Reserve as part of his ROTC obligation after leaving Arizona State.

On August 25, 2008, Monday was presented with an American flag flown over Valley Forge National Historical Park in honor of his 1976 bicentennial flag rescue. Monday still has the flag he grabbed from the protesters that was presented to him on "Rick Monday Day", May 4, 1976, during a pregame ceremony at Wrigley Field by an executive of the Dodgers organization. He has been offered up to $1 million to sell it but has declined all offers.

During a Dodger Stadium game on September 2, 2008, Monday was presented with a Peace On Earth Medallion and a medallion lapel pin by Patricia Kennedy, founder of the non-profit organization Step Up 4 Vets, for his actions.

1981 NLCS
When Monday was mostly a utility player he played a role in the deciding Game 5 of the NLCS at Olympic Stadium in Montreal. Played on a Monday afternoon due to an earlier rain-out, he hit a two-out ninth-inning home run off the Expos' Steve Rogers that proved to be the difference in a 2–1 Dodgers victory. Monday's home run dashed what turned out to be the Expos' only chance at a pennant in their 36-year history in the National League representing Montreal. Even today, heartbroken Expos fans refer to the fifth game of the NLCS as "Blue Monday." According to “The Colorful Montreal Expos” episode of MLB Network Presents, Monday himself was left unaware of “Blue Monday” until he tried eating at a restaurant in Montreal with Steve Yeager during the Dodgers’ first road series in 1982 against the Expos and were asked by the manager to leave since six of the patrons were wanting to instigate a fight with him, with Monday commenting that “The winters are long in Montreal and they don’t forget anything” in response. Los Angeles went on to win the 1981 World Series, defeating the New York Yankees 4 games to 2.

Broadcasting career

Soon after his retirement as a player, Monday became a broadcaster for the Dodgers. He began in 1985 by hosting the pregame show and calling play-by-play on cable TV. From 1989 to 1992, Monday moved farther south to call San Diego Padres games alongside Jerry Coleman, replacing outgoing announcer Dave Campbell. He was also a sports anchor at KTTV for a time in the 1980s. In addition, he served as a color commentator for CBS-TV at the College World Series championship game in 1988. Monday rejoined the Dodgers in 1993, replacing Don Drysdale who died suddenly from a heart attack in his hotel room on a Dodger road trip in Montreal.

From 2005 to 2008, Monday mostly handled the analyst role, with Charley Steiner handling most of the play-by-play, except during road trips outside of the National League West division, during which Steiner broadcast the games on television (because until Vin Scully's retirement at the end of the 2016 season Vin Scully limited his broadcasting to all home games and road games involving either the NL West or AL West,) and Monday handled the radio play-by-play, usually with Jerry Reuss as his analyst.

In 2009, Steiner (play-by-play) and Monday (analysis) began covering all games on radio, with Eric Collins doing TV play-by-play for games not covered by Scully. When Steiner replaced Collins on the road TV broadcasts in 2014, Monday switched over to the play-by-play duties alongside Nomar Garciaparra.

See also

 List of Major League Baseball career home run leaders

References

External links

Rick Monday Biography Baseball Biography 
Vice Sports article on flag burning event

Major League Baseball center fielders
All-American college baseball players
Chicago Cubs players
Los Angeles Dodgers players
Oakland Athletics players
Kansas City Athletics players
American League All-Stars
National League All-Stars
Baseball players from Arkansas
Arizona State Sun Devils baseball players
Lewiston Broncs players
Arizona Instructional League Athletics players
Mobile A's players
Major League Baseball broadcasters
Los Angeles Dodgers announcers
San Diego Padres announcers
1945 births
Living people
United States Marines
People from Batesville, Arkansas
National College Baseball Hall of Fame inductees
Alaska Goldpanners of Fairbanks players